The 2009 Asian Netball Championship was the seventh edition of the Asian Netball Championship, a quadrennial Asian netball championship co-ordinated by the Asian Federation of Netball Associations (AIFNA), inaugurated in 1985. Nine nations competed in the tournament with the Sri Lanka taking out their fourth Asian Championship over Singapore.

Preliminary round

Group A

Group B

Classification matches

5th-8th place Semi-finals

7th place match

5th place match

Knockout stage

Final standings

References
Results

External links

Asian Netball Championship
Asian Netball Championship
2009 in Malaysian sport
June 2009 sports events in Asia
Asia